1967 war may refer to:

 Cambodian Civil War (1967–1975), a conflict between the communists (Khmer Rouge) and the government forces of Cambodia
 Nigerian Civil War (1967-1970), a civil war in Nigeria caused by the attempted secession of Biafra
 Six-Day War (1967), a war between Israel and Egypt, Jordan and Syria